Rudolph Leopold "Pot Pie" Poeschek (born September 29, 1966) is a Canadian former professional ice hockey player who played in the National Hockey League (NHL) with the New York Rangers, Winnipeg Jets, Tampa Bay Lightning, and St. Louis Blues. He played defence, shot right-handed, and was known for his toughness.

Poeschek was drafted by the New York Rangers in the 12th round, 238th overall in the 1985 NHL Entry Draft. He played for the Kamloops Blazers in the WHL for three years and there he established himself as a tough enforcer willing to drop his gloves with anybody. During the 1987–1988 season Poeschek finally played his first game with the Rangers. The following season he played in 52 games with the Rangers and registered a career high 199 penalty minutes.

Prior to the 1993–1994 season the Tampa Bay Lightning picked up Poeschek and it was here that he developed his reputation as an enforcer to be reckoned with, dropping his gloves with the likes of Bob Probert and Craig Berube. Poeschek played 4 seasons with the Lightning before being picked up by the St. Louis Blues. He played a full year there along with parts of two other seasons and one more with the Houston Aeros of the IHL before retiring after 2000–2001 season.

Career statistics

Regular season and playoffs

References

External links
 

1966 births
Living people
Binghamton Rangers players
Canadian ice hockey defencemen
Colorado Rangers players
Flint Generals players
Houston Aeros (1994–2013) players
Ice hockey people from British Columbia
Kamloops Junior Oilers players
Kamloops Blazers players
Moncton Hawks players
New York Rangers draft picks
New York Rangers players
Sportspeople from Kamloops
St. John's Maple Leafs players
St. Louis Blues players
Tampa Bay Lightning players
Vernon Lakers players
Winnipeg Jets (1979–1996) players
Worcester IceCats players